Irène Sweyd (born 7 July 1940) is a Belgian former swimmer. She competed in the women's 100 metre freestyle at the 1956 Summer Olympics.

References

External links
 

1940 births
Living people
Olympic swimmers of Belgium
Swimmers at the 1956 Summer Olympics
Swimmers from Antwerp
Belgian female freestyle swimmers